Balete, officially the Municipality of Balete (Aklanon: Banwa it Balete; Hiligaynon: Banwa sang Balete), is a 4th class municipality in the province of Aklan, Philippines. According to the 2020 census, it has a population of 30,090 people.

Geography

According to the Philippine Statistics Authority, the municipality has a land area of  constituting  of the  total area of Aklan.

Climate

Barangays
Balete is politically subdivided into 10 barangays. Fulgencio was formerly known as Morthon.

Demographics

In the 2020 census, Balete had a population of 30,090.

Economy

Landmarks

During the Philippine Revolution, the hill was the last line of defense of the Filipino patriots during the Spanish-Filipino conflict. The same hill had served as camp for Filipino guerrillas during Japanese occupation during the Second World War. Foxholes had been built on the summit of the hill overlooking potential enemy movement.

Education

Secondary
Private sector schools:
 Balete Academy, Barangay Polacion

Public High schools:
 Calizo National High School, Barangay Calizo
 Cortes Integrated School, Barangay Cortes 
 Fr. Julian C. Rago National High School, Barangay Feliciano
 Jose Borromeo Legaspi Memorial National High School, Barangay Aranas
 Jose F. Meñez Memorial National High School, Barangay Feliciano
 Balete Integrated School

Colleges
 Balete Community College

Notable personalities

 Jonha Richman - businesswoman and philanthropist
 Gabrielle Calizo-Quimpo - politician

References

External links 

 [ Philippine Standard Geographic Code]
 List of Senior High Schools, Balete at Republic of the Philippines Department of Education

Municipalities of Aklan